The Turkish and Islamic Arts Museum is a museum located in Sultanahmet Square in Fatih district of Istanbul, Turkey. Constructed in 1524, the building was formerly the palace of Pargalı Ibrahim Pasha, who was the second grand vizier to Suleiman the Magnificent, and was once thought to have been the husband of the Sultan's sister, Hatice Sultan.

The collection includes notable examples of Islamic calligraphy, tiles, and rugs as well as ethnographic displays on various cultures in Turkey, particularly nomad groups. These displays recreate rooms or dwellings from different time periods and regions.

The space utilized for the museum was once a ceremony hall for the original Palace. Many of the sections of the museum contain notable influences from the palaces well kept setting, making it an impressive art sanctuary dedicated to displaying the culture of Islamic art from various periods. The museum houses over 40,000 works of art that range from carpet art, wooden works, and stone art collections.  The museum is one of the largest museums in Turkey. The Turkish and Islamic Arts Museum is culturally rich in various areas, including its location, as it sits across from the famous Blue Mosque in Istanbul.  The Turkish and Islamic Arts Museum is well respected for its cultivation of art, culture, and history. Over the many years of its existence, the museum has received acknowledgement for being Islamic art hub that narrates the relationship between art history and material culture. The museum was the first to bring together all Islamic arts of Turkey. The museum notably creates and participates in temporary national and international exhibitions since its establishment. In 1984 the museum was awarded Special Jury Award of Museum of the Year Competition of the European Council and a  prize given by European Council - Unesco for its studies for making the children love the culture inheritance.

History 
In 1914 it originally opened as the Museum of Islamic Endowments housed in the Süleymaniye Complex. Süleymaniye Complex, built by the great Turkish architect Sinan in the 16th century. Eventually, the museum renamed as the Turkish and Islamic Arts Museum after the establishment of the Republic of Turkey in 1923 which shifted society with the status of the nation. Along with the transition of society came its influence in exhibition spaces which shifted from representing the Ottoman Empire and more of the overall Islamic world. As Ottoman museums emerged aligning with Turkish Nationalism Turkish society began adopting Western practices in art. In 1983 the museum moved to the İbrahim Pasha Palace. The well preserved building has architectural influences from the 16th century Ottoman civil architecture. The historic stone building was repaired between 1966- 1983. The Turkish and Islamic Arts Museum was the first museum in Turkey to include Islamic art together The function of the beautiful building has varied from serving as a space for grand viziers, barracks, embassy palace, register office, Janissary band house, sewing workshop and prison.

Exhibitions 
In January 2015 the museum closed due to renovation needs and re-opened in April 2015 debuting the new exhibitions. The collections major theme surrounds religious art history from the Ottoman Empire during the 20th century. Similarly the National Museum of Turkish and Islamic Arts exhibits works of art from the Ottoman Empire  includes notable examples of Islamic calligraphy, tiles, and rugs as well as ethnographic displays on various cultures in Turkey, particularly nomad groups. These displays recreate rooms or dwellings from different time periods and regions.

Current 
Today the museum contains some of the finest carpets from the Islamic world as well as over 17,000 manuscripts, plus 3,000 Qur’ans,  and 250,000 early Qur’anic fragments from the Umayyad Mosque in Damascus, amongst other treasures. The collection of artworks displayed are arts from the Islamic world that provide an ethnographic approach in the museum. The exhibitions are structured by floor and center around themes such as the first floor is dedicated to Traditional Turkish life and the second floor is dedicated to Islamic art.

See also
 Sultanahmet
 Istanbul Archaeology Museum
 İstanbul Modern
 Topkapı Palace

Collection highlights

References
 ArchNet: Islamic Architecture Community - Ibrahim Pasha Palace

External links

Official website - Turkish Culture and Tourism ministry
Many pictures from this museum by private photographer
A 373 page book of the museum as a cooperation of Ministry of Culture and Blue Dome Press
Turkish photographer Ahmet Ertuğ published the volume Anatolian Carpets: Masterpieces from the Turkish and Islamic Arts Museum, Istanbul in 1999

Houses completed in 1524
Palaces in Turkey
National museums in Turkey
Art museums and galleries in Istanbul
Fatih
Decorative arts museums
Islamic museums in Turkey